Harzungen is a village and a former municipality in the district of Nordhausen, in Thuringia, Germany. Since July 2018, it is part of the municipality Harztor.

During World War II a concentration camp with 4000 inmates was built in this city.
It was a subcamp of Mittelbau-Dora who was itself a subcamp of the Buchenwald concentration camp.

References

Former municipalities in Thuringia
Nordhausen (district)